Baldwin's rules in organic chemistry are a series of guidelines outlining the relative favorabilities of ring closure reactions in alicyclic compounds. They were first proposed by Jack Baldwin in 1976.

Baldwin's rules discuss the relative rates of ring closures of these various types. These terms are not meant to describe the absolute probability that a reaction will or will not take place, rather they are used in a relative sense. A reaction that is disfavoured (slow) does not have a rate that is able to compete effectively with an alternative reaction that is favoured (fast). However, the disfavoured product may be observed, if no alternate reactions are more favoured.

The rules classify ring closures in three ways:

the number of atoms in the newly formed ring
into exo and endo ring closures, depending whether the bond broken during the ring closure is inside (endo) or outside (exo) the ring that is being formed
into tet, trig and dig geometry of the atom being attacked, depending on whether this electrophilic carbon is tetrahedral (sp3 hybridised), trigonal (sp2 hybridised) or diagonal (sp hybridised).

Thus, a ring closure reaction could be classified as, for example, a 5-exo-trig.

Baldwin discovered that orbital overlap requirements for the formation of bonds favour only certain combinations of ring size and the exo/endo/dig/trig/tet parameters. Interactive 3D models of several of these transition states can be seen here (javascript required).

There are sometimes exceptions to Baldwin's rules. For example, cations often disobey Baldwin's rules, as do reactions in which a third-row atom is included in the ring. An expanded and revised version of the rules is available:

The rules apply when the nucleophile can attack the bond in question in an ideal angle. These angles are 180° (Walden inversion) for exo-tet reactions, 109° (Bürgi–Dunitz angle) for exo-trig reaction and 120° for endo-dig reactions. Angles for nucleophilic attack on alkynes were reviewed and redefined recently. The "acute angle" of attack postulated by Baldwin was replaced with a trajectory similar to the Bürgi–Dunitz angle.

Applications
In one study, seven-membered rings were constructed in a tandem 5-exo-dig addition reaction / Claisen rearrangement:

A 6-endo-dig pattern was observed in an allene - alkyne 1,2-addition / Nazarov cyclization tandem catalysed by a gold compound:

A 5-endo-dig ring closing reaction was part of a synthesis of (+)-Preussin:

Rules for enolates
Baldwin's rules also apply to aldol cyclizations involving enolates. Two new descriptors need to be defined: enolendo and enolexo, which refer to whether both carbons of the enolate C-C fragment are incorporated into the ring formed or not, respectively.

The rules are the following:

Exceptions
These rules are based on empirical evidence and numerous "exceptions" are known. Examples include:
 cyclisations of cations
 reactions involving third-row atoms, such as sulfur
 Transition metal catalysis

References

Physical organic chemistry
Stereochemistry